Hugh III (French: Hugues) was count of Saint-Pol  from 1130 until his death in 1141. He was responsible for massacres and therefore excommunicated.

Biography
The son of Hugh II and Elissende of Ponthieu, Hugh waged a vigorous war against the Collet family, whom he forced to take refuge in the abbey of Saint-Riquier. After besieging the fortress, he stormed it on 28 August 1131 and put it to fire and the sword, killing men, women, and children, including the clergy. The survivors, including the abbot, took refuge in Abbeville. The abbot raised a complaint at the Council of Reims (1131), which excommunicated Hugh in 1132. The ban was confirmed by Pope Innocent II.

His further atrocities against the clergy brought the intervention of King Louis VI, at which point he submitted to penance. He obtained the absolution of Pope Innocent II in 1137 by financing the foundation of three abbeys: Cercamp, Klaarkamp, and Ourscamp.

In 1140, he joined with the Count of Hainaut against Thierry, Count of Flanders, but was defeated.

With his wife, Beatrix of Rollancourt, he had five sons and three daughters:

 Enguerrand
 Hugh, died without issue in 1150
 Anselm
 Ralph, died 4 April 1142, buried in Cercamp
 Guy, married Matilda of Doullens
 Angélique or Angéline, wife of Anselm of Housdain
 Adelaide, wife of Robert V, Lord of Béthune, with whom she had 8 children including Jean de Béthune, Bishop of Cambrai
 Beatrix, wife of Robert, fourth son of Ralph I, Lord of Coucy

Beatrix, the mother of these children, is buried at Cercamp.

Sources
  Maurus Dantine, Charles Clémencet, Nicolas Viton de Saint-Allais, Ursin Durand, François Clément, L'art de vérifier les dates des faits historiques, des chartes, des chroniques [etc].... 1750 and subsequent editions
 G Er Sauvage, Histoire de Saint-Pol  
 François César Louandre, Histoire ancienne et moderne d'Abbeville et de son arrondissement A. Boulanger, 1834 (online version)
 Ernest Warlop: Campus Avenae: het wapen van de graven van Saint-Pol. In: Carlos Wyffels u. a. (eds.): Gedenkboek Michiel Mispelon. Familia et Patria, Kortemark-Handzame 1982, pp. 587–599
 Jean-François Nieus: Un pouvoir comtal entre Flandre et France. Saint-Pol, 1000–1300. De Boeck, Brussels 2005 (Bibliothèque du Moyen Âge 23)  (also: Louvain-la-Neuve, university dissertation, 2001: Le comté de Saint-Pol des origines à la fin du XIIIe siècle)

1141 deaths
Counts of Saint-Pol